Kim Hyeong-cheol (born 3 January 1981) is a South Korean alpine skier. He competed in the men's giant slalom at the 2006 Winter Olympics.

References

1981 births
Living people
South Korean male alpine skiers
Olympic alpine skiers of South Korea
Alpine skiers at the 2006 Winter Olympics
Place of birth missing (living people)
21st-century South Korean people